Le Conquérant was a French Navy  of the M6 ​​series commissioned in 1936. She participated in World War II, first on the side of the Allies from 1939 to June 1940, then in the navy of Vichy France. She was sunk in November 1942.

Characteristics

Le Conquérant was part of a fairly homogeneous series of 31 deep-sea patrol submarines also called "1,500-tonners" because of their displacement. All entered service between 1931 and 1939.

They displaced  on the surface and  underwater. When submerged, their two electric motors produced a combined  and allowed them to reach .

Construction and commissioning

Laid down at Ateliers et Chantiers de Saint-Nazaire Penhoët in Saint-Nazaire, France, on 16 August 1930 with the hull number Q171, Le Conquérant was launched on 26 June 1934. She was commissioned on 7 September 1936.

Service history

1936–1939
On 1 May 1938, Le Conquérant departed Toulon for a deployment to French Indochina in Southeast Asia. She was based in French Indochina from May to October 1938 with her sister ship , then returned to Toulon, where both submarines arrived on 15 December 1938.

World War II

French Navy
At the start of World War II in September 1939, Le Conquérant was assigned to the 1st Submarine Division of the 3rd Submarine Squadron of the 1st Flotilla of the 2nd Squadron based at Toulon. She was undergoing a major overhaul when the war broke out.

German ground forces advanced into France on 10 May 1940, beginning the Battle of France, and Italy declared war on France on 10 June 1940 and joined the invasion. Le Conquérant′s overhaul was completed in June 1940, and from 20 June she patrolled off Les Salins d'Hyères to protect Toulon. The Battle of France ended in France's defeat and an armistice with Germany and Italy that went into effect on 25 June 1940.

Vichy France
After France's surrender, Le Conquérant served in the naval forces of Vichy France. Three of Le Conquérant′s sailors deserted before she left port. The three Le Conquérant sailors, who had attempted to reach Free French forces via Spanish Morocco, were arrested, convicted of desertion by the military court in Casablanca, French Morocco, and sentenced to a year in prison.

On 1 January 1942, Le Conquérant was part of the 4th Submarine Division along with Le Tonnant and the submarine . In September 1942, Le Conquérant, Le Tonnant, and their sister ship  were transferred from Dakar in Senegal to Casablanca. On 1 November 1942, Le Conquérant still was part of the 4th Submarine Division, but by then the only other submarine in the division was Le Tonnant.

On 6 November 1942, Le Conquérant entered drydock at Casablanca for a refit that was scheduled for completion in early December 1942. On 8 November 1942, however, Allied forces landed in French North Africa in Operation Torch and the Naval Battle of Casablanca began between United States Navy and Vichy French forces. At 06:15, the U.S. Navy aircraft carrier  and escort aircraft carrier  launched an airstrike against Casablanca, and SBD Dauntless dive bombers began attacking targets in the harbor at 07:10. Although Le Conquérant'''s attack periscope was not installed and she had no torpedoes aboard, leaving her unfit for combat, she was launched from drydock and cast off at 08:00. Moments later, a  shell fired by the U.S. Navy battleship  sank the drydock.Le Conquérant received orders to refuel in the outer roadstead. She spent the rest of the morning submerged off Casablanca. After she surfaced in the afternoon, American aircraft strafed her several times, damaging her search periscope — the only periscope she had on board — and wounding two members of her crew manning her machine guns. During the evening, she entered port at Casablanca and refueled from tankers moored there.

Ordered to make for either Dakar in Senegal or Port-Étienne in Mauritania, Le Conquérant got underway from Casablanca on 9 November 1942 at either 05:00 or in the evening, according to different sources. While she was at sea, the Allies and Vichy French forces in North Africa signed a ceasefire on 11 November 1942.

LossLe Conquérant was on the surface bound for Dakar off Cisneros in Río de Oro on 13 November 1942 when two PBY Catalina flying boats of U.S. Navy Patrol Squadron 92 (VP-92) sighted her. The aircraft circled and challenged her, but saw no one on deck and received no reply. A French source maintains that Le Conquérant had French tricolor markings on her conning tower which should have made her nationality clear to the circling PBYs.

As a result of a postwar examination of records to determine the identity of the PBYs' victim, the U.S. Navy proposed in 1948 that they had sunk Le Conquérant′s sister ship Sidi Ferruch. It eventually became clear, however, that Sidi Ferruch'' had been sunk off Fedhala Roads, French Morocco, on 11 November 1942.

References

Citations

Bibliography

 
 
 
 

Redoutable-class submarines (1928)
1934 ships
Ships built in France
World War II submarines of France
Maritime incidents in November 1942
Warships lost in combat with all hands
Submarines sunk by aircraft
Lost submarines of France
World War II shipwrecks in the Atlantic Ocean